The Meiklejohn Civil Liberties Institute (MCLI) is a Berkeley, California-based non-profit think-tank, activism incubator, library and archive. Named for Alexander Meiklejohn, a philosopher, university administrator, and free-speech advocate, MCLI was founded in 1965.

The Meiklejohn Civil Liberties Institute carries on a wide range of activities, including research, publication, advocacy, and education. Its quarterly newsletter was entitled Human Rights Now! The Institute's collection was later made available to the public through the Bancroft Library of the University of California at Berkeley, the University of Michigan’s Labadie Collection, and San Francisco State University’s Labor Archive.

The founding executive director of MCLI is attorney-scholar-educator-activist Ann Fagan Ginger. In 2018, Steven DeCaprio became Interim Executive Director.

References

External links
Meiklejohn Civil Liberties Institute
Inventory of the Meiklejohn Civil Liberties Institute Records at The Bancroft Library
Meiklejohn Civil Liberties Institute Collected Records held at Swarthmore College Peace Collection

Human rights organizations based in the United States
Civil rights organizations in the United States
Non-profit organizations based in California
Organizations established in 1965
Organizations based in Berkeley, California